Boston Simbeye (born 24 December 1959) is a former Malawian welterweight boxer. He competed at the 1988 Summer Olympics, where he finished in thirty-third place.

References

1959 births
Living people
Malawian male boxers
Olympic boxers of Malawi
Boxers at the 1988 Summer Olympics
Welterweight boxers